Fumaria capreolata, the white ramping fumitory, is an herbaceous annual plant in the poppy family Papaveraceae. It is native to Europe, western Asia and northern Africa  and naturalised in southern Australia, New Zealand, and southern South America. Common names include climbing fumitory, ramping fumitory, white fumitory, white ramping fumitory and white-flower fumitory.

Description
Plants have stems to 1 metre long and sometimes climb. The leaves are pinnatisect. Inflorescences comprise up to 20 purple-tipped white to cream flowers that appear in spring and summer. These gradually become pink after pollination.

Unlike other Fumaria species which are known as weeds of crops and agricultural areas, Fumaria capreolata can become naturalised in areas of natural vegetation and smother low-growing plants, becoming an environmental weed.

References

External links
GBIF: Fumaria capreolata occurrence data map & photos.  Global Biodiversity Information Facility. Retrieved 27 August 2018.
Weeds of Australia identification tool: Factsheet - Fumaria capreolata. Queensland Government.

capreolata
Plants described in 1753
Taxa named by Carl Linnaeus
Flora of Malta